Ar'ara (lit. "Juniper tree") is an Arab town in the Wadi Ara region in northern Israel. It is located southwest of Umm al-Fahm just northwest of the Green Line, and is part of the Triangle.

History

Persian to Mamluk periods
Pottery sherds from Persian period have been found here.

Burial complexes from the Roman period have been excavated at Ar'ara, revealing clay lamps, glass vessels and beads, commonly used in the 1st to 4th century CE. Rock-cut tombs with niches, and Byzantine period ceramics have been found.

In the Crusader period, the place was known as "Castellum Arearum". In the land allocation made by sultan Baybars in 663 H. (1265-1266 C.E.), Ar'ara was shared between his amirs Ala' al-Din and Sayf al-Din Bayhaq al-Baghdadi.

A few clay fragments from the Mamluk period have been found at the same location as the Roman remains.

Ottoman period
Ar'ara, like the rest of Palestine, was incorporated into the Ottoman Empire in 1517, and in 1596, Ar'ara appeared in Ottoman tax registers as being in the Nahiya of Sa'ra of the Liwa of Lajjun. It had a population of 8 Muslim households and paid a fixed tax rate of 25% on agricultural products, which included wheat, barley, summer crops, olives, and goats or beehives; a total of 9,000 akçe.

By the eighteenth century, the village remained in the administrative district of Lajjun, but the revenue of the place was farmed for the Mutasarrıf of Jaffa. 
In 1838, it was noted as a village in the Jenin district.

In the late nineteenth century, the site was described as: A village of moderate size on high ground, with a spring to the east, a second to the west and a well to the south. There are rock cut tombs near. The population is stated by Consul Rogers (1859) as 400, the cultivation then being 30 feddans.

A population list from about 1887 showed that Ar'arah had about 600 inhabitants; all Muslims.

British Mandate
In the 1922 census of Palestine conducted by the British Mandate authorities, Ar'ara had a population 735, all Muslims. This had increased in the 1931 census to 971, still all Muslims, in 150 houses.

In the 1945 statistics, Ar'ara and Arah had a population of 2,290 Muslims,
1,490 in Ar'ara and 800 in 'Ara, and a privately owned land area of 29,537 dunums, in addition to 5,802 dunams of publicly owned land. Of this, 1,724 dunams were for plantations and irrigable land, 20,560 for cereals, while 33 dunams were built-up (urban) land.

State of Israel
Ar'ara was transferred from Jordanian to Israeli jurisdiction in 1949 under the Rhodes armistice agreements.

By 1962 the area had been reduced to 7,269 dunums, partly due to expropriations of 8,236 dunums by the Israeli government in 1953–54. One case of expropriation from a private landowner named Younis became a test case before the High Court of Israel in 1953, as the land had been expropriated by the government without notifying the owner. In 1954 the court ruled that the law did not require the owner to be notified and did not provide a right for the owner to contest the expropriation in advance. This ruling and one other effectively ended the possibility of land owners using the courts to contest the seizure of their land. The neighboring village of ʿAra was merged with Ar'ara in 1985.

Maqam Shaykh Khalaf
Maqam Shaykh Khalaf is the only building which was noted by the Israel Antiquities Authority in the Mandate area, and it is located on a slope by the highest point in the village, set in the middle of extensive graveyards. The Maqam is a single rectangular chamber, covered by a dome. The two top courses are chamfered towards the dome. On the north side is a doorway, and double window set inside shallow arches. There is also a set of windows on the west side. Inside, there are three cenotaphs, located east-west, close to the west wall. A mihrab is located on the south wall. The date of the building is not known, but according to A. Petersen (who inspected the place in 1994), the architecture indicate an eighteenth or early nineteenth century date.

See also
 Arab localities in Israel

References

Bibliography

 (II, p. 88)
Baedeker, K., 1867, Palestine and Syria. A Handbook for Travellers, Dulan & Co., London ( p. 299)

 Cited in Petersen, (2001)

 
 

Hartmann, R., (1910), 'Die Strasse von Damascus nach Kairo', ZDMG (=Zeitschrift des Deutschen Morgenlandische Gesellschaft), 64, ( pp. 665–702) (p. 700)

External links
Official website
Welcome To 'Ar'ara
Survey of Western Palestine, Map 8: IAA, Wikimedia commons 

Arab localities in Israel
Triangle (Israel)
Local councils in Haifa District